Strange Luck is an American television series that aired on Fox, created by Karl Schaefer and starring D. B. Sweeney in the role of Chance Harper who constantly stumbles into unusual situations. The series aired on Fox from 1995 to 1996. A total of seventeen episodes were aired before the show was canceled due to low ratings. Reruns were shown briefly on the Sci Fi Channel in 1997. The series was initially slotted as a lead-in to The X-Files on Friday nights, and was largely shot in Canada like the show which followed it.

Plot
Chance Harper, a freelance photographer, is afflicted with a bizarre tendency to always be in the wrong place at the right time. As Chance himself says, "If I go to a restaurant, somebody chokes.  If I walk into a bank, it gets robbed."  Harper's strange luck began when, as a small child, he was the sole survivor of a plane crash that killed everyone else aboard, including his mother and sister.

Cast 
 D. B. Sweeney as Chance Harper
 Pamela Gidley as Audrey Westin
 Cynthia Martells as Dr. Richter
 Frances Fisher as Angie
 Drew Monroe as Spirit
 Scott Plank as Arthur Vandenberg

Production

Casting 
D. B. Sweeney had been primarily a film actor before taking the role of Chance Harper. He did so because he had a series of unsuccessful low-budget films and decided to try his hand at television. He commented that "Fox has spent more time and money and effort promoting me and this show than all of my movies put together"

Episodes

Awards

References

External links 
 
 TV Guide: Strange Luck

Fox Broadcasting Company original programming
1990s American drama television series
1995 American television series debuts
1996 American television series endings
Television series by New World Television
Television shows set in Missouri